Hamstead Hall Academy is a mixed secondary school and sixth form located in the Handsworth Wood area of Birmingham, in the West Midlands of England. The school is situated next to the Sandwell Valley RSPB reserve.

Previously a foundation school administered by Birmingham City Council, Hamstead Hall converted to academy status in June 2013. However the school continues to coordinate with Birmingham City Council for admissions.

Hamstead Hall Academy offers GCSEs and BTECs as programmes of study for pupils, while students in the sixth form have the option to study from a range of A-levels and further BTECs.

References

External links
Hamstead Hall Academy official website

Secondary schools in Birmingham, West Midlands
Academies in Birmingham, West Midlands